Hamer v. Neighborhood Housing Services of Chicago, 583 U.S. ___ (2017), is a decision by the United States Supreme Court, holding that failure to comply with the deadline for filing a notice of appeal, established by Federal Rule of Appellate Procedure, Rule 4(a)(5)(C), does not necessitate dismissal of a case.

See also
 List of United States Supreme Court cases
 Lists of United States Supreme Court cases by volume
 List of United States Supreme Court cases by the Roberts Court

References

External links
 

United States Supreme Court cases
United States Supreme Court cases of the Roberts Court
2017 in United States case law